Andrea Quattrocchi Rivarola (born 23 March 1989) is a Paraguayan actress and ballerina, famous for her roles on Paraguayan television and participation in the reality TV dancing competition Baila Conmigo Paraguay. She currently lives in Buenos Aires, Argentina.

Career 

In 2008 she received acclaim for her part as Ramonita, a maid, in Papá del corazón. In 2009 she was in De mil amores, where her character was a blind woman called Lucia. In 2010 she was in La doña, playing the seductress and villain, Beatriz.

On 14 October 2010 she was broadcast in the reality show Baila Conmigo Paraguay (Dance with me, Paraguay), in which she competed as a celebrity contestant. She was a favourite on account of her skill at dancing and reached the final, competing against the singer Nadia "La Kchorra" Portillo, who defeated her for first place. Initially it was reported that Quattrocchi was the winner, but later it was reported that there had been a mistake tallying the votes and that La Kchorra was actually the winner. This remains controversial, with many considering the correction to have been an injustice on the part of the programme.

At the beginning of 2011, Quattrocchi moved to Buenos Aires, Argentina, where she was selected from among 400 applicants for a scholarship to study musical comedy at the school of the Argentine ballet dancer Julio Bocca. She made her debut on the Buenos Airesian stage in Feizbuk Tours, directed by the Argentine director Jose Maria Muscari. She received her debut on Argentine television from recognised Argentine director Juan Jose Campanella, on the El hombre de tu vida, produced by Telefe. On this show Quattrocchi played the part of Nidia in the 2012 season.

In 2014 she participated in the dancing programme Baila Conmigo Paraguay 2014, forming a pair with Jorge Moliniers who had participated in Bailando 2012 and Bailando 2014 on the Argentine series, Showmatch.

Filmography

Television

Films

References

External links 
 
 
 Andrea Quattrocchi and her role in La Doña
 Andrea Quattrocchi on Tercer Tiempo
 Trailer of SEMANA CAPITAL
 

Paraguayan television actresses
Paraguayan people of Italian descent
Paraguayan emigrants to Argentina
People from Asunción
21st-century Paraguayan actresses
Paraguayan dancers
Ballerinas
Living people
1989 births